Robert Mistrík (born 13 August 1966) is a Slovak chemist, scientist, businessman and politician.

Early life

Robert Mistrík was born on 13 August 1966 in Banská Bystrica, where he spent his childhood. He attended the Gymnázium Jozefa Gregora Tajovského in Banská Bystrica and in 1991 graduated with a degree in Analytical Chemistry from the Faculty of Chemical Technology of the Slovak Technical University in Bratislava. He completed a PhD at the University of Vienna in 1994. He continued his scientific career as a visiting scholar at the National Institute of Standards and Technology in Gaithersburg, Maryland.

Career

In 1998, Mistrík founded the mass spectrometry, metabolomics and chemical analysis firm HighChem, which he still runs today. He served as a member of the scientific committee at the METACancer consortium, aimed at investigating biomarkers for breast cancer. He serves on the board of directors of the Metabolomics Society.

Political career

Robert Mistrík was one of the co-founders of the centre-right Freedom and Solidarity party, of which he was a member until 2012. On 15 May 2018 he announced his candidacy for the 2019 Slovak presidential election, but later withdrew it.

References

External links
 Official website

Living people
Candidates for President of Slovakia
Slovak chemists
University of Vienna alumni
Politicians from Banská Bystrica
1966 births
Freedom and Solidarity politicians
Slovak University of Technology in Bratislava alumni